Louis Ferdinand, Prince of Prussia (9 November 1907 –  26 September 1994) was a member of the princely House of Hohenzollern, which occupied the Prussian and German thrones, until the abolition of those monarchies in 1918. He was also noteworthy as a businessman and patron of the arts.

Biography

Louis Ferdinand was born in Potsdam as the third in succession to the throne of the German Empire, after his father, German Crown Prince William and elder brother Prince Wilhelm of Prussia. The monarchy was abolished after Germany's revolution in 1918. When Louis Ferdinand's older brother Prince Wilhelm renounced his succession rights to marry a member of the untitled nobility in 1933 (he was later to be killed in action in France in 1940 while fighting in the German army), Louis Ferdinand replaced him as second in the line of succession to the defunct German and Prussian thrones after the former Crown Prince.

Louis Ferdinand was educated in Berlin and deviated from his family's tradition by not pursuing a military career. Instead, he travelled extensively and settled for some time in Detroit, where he befriended Henry Ford and became acquainted with Franklin D. Roosevelt, among others. He held a great interest in engineering. Recalled from the United States upon his brother's renunciation of the throne, he became involved in the German aviation industry, but was barred by Hitler from taking any active part in German military activities.

Louis Ferdinand dissociated himself from the Nazis after this. He was not involved in the 20 July plot against Hitler in 1944 but was interrogated by the Gestapo immediately afterwards. He was released shortly afterwards.

He married his second cousin once removed, Grand Duchess Kira Kirillovna of Russia, in 1938 in first a Russian Orthodox ceremony in Potsdam and then a Lutheran ceremony in Huis Doorn, Netherlands. Kira was the second daughter of Grand Duke Kyril Vladimirovich and Princess Victoria Melita of Saxe-Coburg and Gotha. The couple had four sons and three daughters. His two eldest sons both renounced their succession rights in order to marry commoners. His third son and heir apparent, Prince Louis Ferdinand, died in 1977 during military maneuvers, and thus his one-year-old grandson Georg Friedrich, Prince of Prussia (son of Prince Louis Ferdinand) became the new heir apparent to the defunct Prussian and German Imperial throne. Upon Louis Ferdinand's death in 1994, Georg Friedrich became the pretender to the defunct thrones and head of the Hohenzollern family. After the reunification of Germany, Louis Ferdinand arranged to have the remains of several Hohenzollern members reinterred at the imperial vault in Potsdam.

The prince was a popular figure. In 1968 Der Spiegel reported that in a survey of their readers by Quick magazine about who would be the most honorable person to become President of the Federal Republic of Germany, Louis Ferdinand, the only one of twelve candidates who was not a politician, won with 39.8% before Carlo Schmid and Ludwig Erhard. In a similar survey by the tabloid Bild, readers chose Louis Ferdinand by 55.6%. In an interview with Quick, the prince indicated that he might accept the presidency but would not relinquish his claim to the imperial or Prussian crowns.

Prince Ferdinand of Hohenzollern, a member of the senior Swabian branch of the Hohenzollern dynasty, Hohenzollern-Sigmaringen, is his godson.

Ancestry

Notes

External links

European Royal History entry on Prince Louis-Ferdinand

 

1907 births
1994 deaths
House of Hohenzollern
Crown Princes of Prussia
Prussian princes
Pretenders to the German throne
Recipients of the Pour le Mérite (civil class)
Knights of the Golden Fleece
German monarchists
People from Potsdam
People of the German Empire
German people of Prussian descent
German people of Russian descent
German people of British descent